The top tier of English rugby league was renamed the Super League for the start of the 1996 season. The following page details the records and statistics of the Super League.

League Records

Titles
Grand Finals
Most titles: 
9   St Helens (St Helens also won Super League in 1996 but the title was decided by league standings then)
 Most consecutive title wins: 
4   St. Helens (2019, 2020, 2021, 2022)
Most Grand Final appearances:
13   St. Helens

League Leaders Shield (awarded since 2003)
Most League Leaders Shield wins: 
8  St. Helens 
 Most consecutive League Leaders Shield wins: 
4   St. Helens (2005, 2006, 2007, 2008)
Biggest League Leaders Shield winning margin: 
16 points, 2019;  St. Helens (52 points) over  Wigan Warriors (36 points) 
 Smallest League Leaders Shield winning margin: 
0 points and 26 points difference - 2015;  Leeds Rhinos (+294) over  Wigan Warriors (+268). Both teams finished on 41 points, but Leeds won the League Leaders Shield with a superior points difference.

In 2002,  St. Helens (+405) finished ahead of  Bradford Bulls (+391) by 0 points and 14 points difference but this predated the introduction of the League Leaders Shield.

Team records

Most points scored in a season (total)

1152,  Leeds Rhinos, Super League X, 2005

Most points scored in a season (points per game)

43.18 (950 pts in 22 games),  St. Helens, Super League I, 1996

 Most tries scored in a season

213,  Leeds Rhinos, Super League X, 2005

 Most goals scored in a season

204,  Bradford Bulls, Super League VI. 2001

 Most drop goals scored in a season

11,  Halifax, Super League IV, 1999, and  Warrington Wolves, Super League VII, 2002

 Fewest points conceded in a season (total)

195,  St Helens, Super League XXV, 2020 (shortened season due to COVID-19 pandemic meant St Helens only played 17 games)

 Fewest points conceded in a season (points per game)

9.65 (222 pts in 23 games)  Wigan Warriors, Super League III, 1998

 Most points conceded in a season

1210,  Leigh Centurions, Super League X, 2005

Longest undefeated streak and longest winning streak:

21 games,  Bradford Bulls, 24 August 1996 to 22 August 1997

Longest winless streak and longest losing streak:

27 games,  Halifax, 7 March 2003 to 21 September 2003 (Record could continue as Halifax were relegated at the end of the 2003 season and have not yet returned to Super League)

Individual records

Games

Most Super League games:
468, James Roby for  St. Helens (2004- )

Tries

Most Super League tries:
247, Danny McGuire for  Leeds Rhinos and  Hull KR (2001-2019)
Most tries in a season
40, Denny Solomona, for  Castleford Tigers in 2016
Most tries in a game:
7, Bevan French for ( Wigan Warriors v.  Hull FC, (15 July 2022)
Fastest try in a game:
7 seconds, Ben Crooks for  Hull Kingston Rovers vs  Huddersfield Giants (16 April 2021)

Goals
Most goals in a season:
178, Henry Paul ( Bradford Bulls, 2001)
Most goals in a game (inc' drop goals):
14, Henry Paul (for  Bradford Bulls v.  Salford Red Devils, 25 June 2000)
Most drop goals in a season:
11, Lee Briers ( Warrington Wolves, 2002)
Most drop goals in a game:
5, Lee Briers (for  Warrington Wolves v.  Halifax, 25 May 2002)

Points

Most Super League points:
3,443, Kevin Sinfield for  Leeds Rhinos, 1997-2015
Most points in a season (regular season):
388, Andy Farrell ( Wigan Warriors, 2001), and Pat Richards ( Wigan Warriors, 2010)
Most points in a season (regular season & playoffs):
434, Pat Richards ( Wigan Warriors, 2010)
Most points in a game:
42, Iestyn Harris (for  Leeds Rhinos v.  Huddersfield Giants, 16 July 1999)

Coaches

Most Super League championships:
4, Brian McDermott (for  Leeds Rhinos in 2011, 2012, 2015, and 2017)
Most Super League matches
502, Tony Smith (for  Huddersfield Giants 2001 & 2003,  Leeds Rhinos 2004-2007,  Warrington Wolves 2009-2017,  Hull KR 2019-2022, &  Hull (2023-present)

Match Records

Biggest home win: 96-16,  Bradford Bulls v.  Salford City Reds (25 June 2000)
Biggest away win: 6-84,  Hull Kingston Rovers v.  Wigan Warriors (1 April 2013)
Lowest scoring game:4-0, Salford City Reds v Castleford Tigers (16 March 1997), 0-4,  Celtic Crusaders v.  St. Helens (7 March 2009) 4-0,  St. Helens v.  Castleford Tigers (30 August 2019), and 4-0  Warrington v.  Hull F.C. (24 June 2022)
Highest scoring game with no tries:  Salford City Reds 5-2  Harlequins RL (15 June 2007)
Most points in a game by one team: 96,  Bradford Bulls v.  Salford City Reds (25 June 2000)
Most tries in a game by one team: 17,  Bradford Bulls v.  Salford City Reds (25 June 2000)

Attendance Records
Highest Super League attendance (excluding Magic Weekend and Grand Final): 
31,555,  Catalans Dragons v.  Wigan Warriors (at Camp Nou, 18 May 2019)
Lowest Super League attendance (excluding games played behind closed doors):
500,  PSG v.  Salford City Reds (at Stade Sebastien Charlety, 2 July 1997)
Highest Magic Weekend attendance, weekend:
68,276 St James' Park (21-22 May 2016)
Lowest Magic Weekend attendance, weekend:
52,043 Murrayfield (1-2 May 2010)
Highest Grand Final attendance:
73,512,  Leeds Rhinos v.  Wigan Warriors (at Old Trafford, 10 October 2015)
Lowest Grand Final attendance (excluding 2020 Grand Final played behind closed doors):
43,533,  Leeds Rhinos v.  Wigan Warriors (at Old Trafford, 24 October 1998)

See also
Super League
List of players with 1,000 Super League points

References
engage Super League Records
Rugby League Record Keepers' Club

Rugby league records and statistics
Rugby league-related lists
Records